Jordan Christopher Cranston (born 11 November 1993) is a professional footballer who plays for AFC Fylde, as a left-back. Born in England, he made two appearances for the Wales U19 national team.

Club career
Cranston spent his early career with Wolverhampton Wanderers before signing his first professional contract, a one-year deal with a further year's option.

In March 2014, Cranston joined Conference Premier side Nuneaton Town on loan until the end of the season. Upon his return from a loan spell at Nuneaton Town, having made seven appearances, Cranston was released by Wolverhampton Wanderers management upon expiry of his contract.

After being released by Wolves, Cranston joined Hednesford Town on a free transfer. However, only seven days at the club, Cranston re-joined Nuneaton Town.

After one appearance on his return to Nuneaton Town, Cranston signed for Notts County on 1 September 2014, with the club's official website stating the contract was a short-term deal. On 2 September 2014, Cranston made his professional debut for Notts County in a 2–0 Football League Trophy victory against Mansfield Town. Cranston made his league debut for the club, playing as a left-back, in a 0–0 draw against Peterborough United eleven days later after making his debut. Having made eight appearances between September and October, Cranston was awarded an 18-month contract, keeping him until January 2016.

He joined Lincoln City on loan in February 2015, before being recalled in April 2015.

In July 2015 he went on trial with Gateshead, and later that month Cranston left Notts County by mutual consent. He signed a one-year contract with Gateshead in August 2015. Cranston joined National League rivals Cheltenham Town for an undisclosed fee on 30 January 2016, being given the number 21 shirt. On 10 May 2018, it was announced that Cranston would leave Cheltenham at the end of his current deal in June 2018. He signed for Morecambe in July 2018.

In May 2019, following the end of the 2018–19 season, Cranston's goal was voted 'Goal of the Season' at Morecambe's end of the season awards. In June 2019 he signed a new two-year contract with Morecambe.

In August 2020, Cranston joined Solihull Moors for an undisclosed fee on a two-year deal. Cranston was released on 6 June 2022, the following day from defeat in the 2022 National League play-off Final.

On 20 June 2022, Cranston joined National League North club AFC Fylde on a one-year deal.

International career
Cranston made two appearances for Wales under-19s in 2011.

Career statistics

Honours
Cheltenham Town
 Vanarama National League: 2015–16

References

1993 births
Living people
English footballers
English people of Welsh descent
Welsh footballers
Wales youth international footballers
Wolverhampton Wanderers F.C. players
Nuneaton Borough F.C. players
Hednesford Town F.C. players
Notts County F.C. players
Lincoln City F.C. players
Gateshead F.C. players
Cheltenham Town F.C. players
Morecambe F.C. players
Solihull Moors F.C. players
AFC Fylde players
English Football League players
National League (English football) players
Association football fullbacks